Weir Wood Reservoir is a  biological Site of Special Scientific Interest west of Forest Row in East Sussex.

This is one of the largest bodies of open water in the county and it has rich and diverse communities of breeding, wintering and passage birds. Breeding birds include great crested grebe, teal, mute swan, tufted duck, little grebe, reed warbler, sedge warbler, coot and moorhen.

Weir Wood is also home to a sailing club and a fishing lodge.

References

External links
 Friends of Weir Wood
 Weir Wood Sailing Club

Local Nature Reserves in East Sussex
Sites of Special Scientific Interest in East Sussex
Forest Row